Speyburn distillery in Rothes, Moray, Scotland, was founded in 1897 by John Hopkins & Company for the sum of £17,000. The site was chosen by John Hopkins himself for its unpolluted water supply from the Granty Burn, a minor tributary of the River Spey. Hopkins appointed the famous distillery architect Charles C Doig to design the distillery and to this day Speyburn has its classic pagoda ventilator, a hallmark of Doig's design.

The proprietors, keen to have production started to ensure that the first fillings could bear the date 1897 - Queen Victoria's Diamond Jubilee - had scheduled production to begin on 1 November 1897. However, due to delays, the stills did not run until 15 December. When production finally began, the still house was without doors and windows. Under the watchful eye of the distillery's manager, John Smith, the first spirit was run off in a violent snow storm with the distillery men working in overcoats and mufflers to protect them from the elements. However, the proprietors succeeded in achieving their ambition and one butt was produced and bonded bearing the date 1897.

Speyburn Single Highland Scotch Malt whisky is exported throughout the world and it is currently the number 9 best selling single malt whisky in the USA.

The distillery is owned by Inver House Distillers Limited, a distiller whose other distilleries include Old Pulteney Distillery, Knockdhu Distillery, Balblair Distillery, and Balmenach Distillery.

Awards

San Francisco World Spirits Competition 2020

Speyburn Arranta Casks - Silver

Speyburn 10 Years Old - Gold

Speyburn 15 Years Old - Gold

Speyburn 18 Years Old - Gold

World Whiskies Awards 2019

Speyburn 15 Years Old - Gold

International Wine & Spirits Competition 2019

Speyburn Arranta Casks - Silver

Speyburn 15 Years Old - Silver

Speyburn 18 Years Old - Silver

Ultimate Spirits Challenge 2019

Speyburn Arranta Casks - 95 Points, Great Value, Tried & True

Speyburn 10 Years Old - 87 Points

Speyburn 15 Years Old - 95 Points, Great Valie

Speyburn 18 Years Old - 93 Points

International Spirits Challenge 2018

Speyburn 10 Years Old - Silver

Speyburn 15 Years Old - Silver

International Wine & Spirits Challenge 2018

Speyburn Bradan Orach - Silver

Speyburn 15 Years Old - Silver

Speyburn 10 Years Old - Silver

Ultimate Spirits Challenge 2018

Speyburn 10 Years Old - Speyburn - 95 points in Scotch/Single Malt/Speyside competition

Speyburn Arranta Casks - Scotch/Single Malt/Speyside competition scores - Speyburn Arranta Casks

Speyburn 15 Years Old - Scotch/Single Malt/Speyside competition scores - Speyburn

Speyburn Bradan Orach - Scotch/Single Malt/Speyside competition scores - Speyburn Bradan Orach

San Francisco Wine & Spirits Challenge

Speyburn 15 Years Old - Double Gold

Speyburn 12 Years Old - Gold

Speyburn 25 Years Old - Gold

Speyburn 10 Years Old - Silver

Speyburn Bradan Orach - Bronze

World Whisky Awards 2018

Speyburn Bradan Orach - Bronze

International Wine and Spirit Competition 2017

Speyburn Arranta Casks - Gold

Speyburn 15 Years Old - Silver

Speyburn Bradan Orach - Silver

Speyburn 10 Years Old - Silver

New York International Spirits Competition 2017

Speyburn Bradan Orach - Double Gold

New York International Spirits Competition 2017

Speyburn 10 Years Old - Silver

Speyburn Arranta Casks - Silver

San Francisco World Spirits Competition 2017

Speyburn Arranta - Double Gold

Speyburn 10 Years Old - Gold

International Spirits Challenge 2017

Speyburn Arranta Casks – Gold

Speyburn 10 Years Old - Silver

Speyburn Bradan Orach - Silver

Ultimate Spirits Challenge 2017

Speyburn Arranta - 94 points, Great Value

Speyburn Bradan Orach - 91 points, Great Value

Speyburn 10 Years Old - 89 points

IWSC 2016

Speyburn 10 Years Old – Silver

Speyburn Bradan Orach	- Silver

Speyburn Arranta Casks – Silver Outstanding

International Spirits Challenge 2016

Speyburn 10 Years Old – Silver

Speyburn Bradan Orach	- Silver

Speyburn Arranta Casks - Gold
Ultimate Spirits Challenge 2016

Speyburn 10 Years Old, Tried & True

Speyburn Bradan Orach	96 points, Great Value

San Francisco World Spirits Competition 2016

Speyburn 10 Years Old – Silver

Speyburn Arranta Casks - Silver 

New York World Spirits Competition

Speyburn – Speyside Distillery of the Year

See also
 Whisky
 Scotch whisky
 List of whisky brands
 List of distilleries in Scotland

References

External links
 
 Inver House Distillers Limited, corporate website

Distilleries in Scotland
Scottish malt whisky
1897 establishments in Scotland
Food and drink companies established in 1897
Rothes